Dr. Manisha Kayande is an Indian politician and member of Shiv Sena from Maharashtra. She is a member of Maharashtra Legislative Council. Earlier, she was with BJP and a losing candidate as its member in 2009 assembly elections from Sion-Koliwada seat.

Positions held
 2016: Appointed spokesperson of Shiv Sena
 2018: Elected to Maharashtra Legislative Council

See also
 List of members of the Maharashtra Legislative Council

References

External links
 The Shivsena

Shiv Sena politicians
Members of the Maharashtra Legislative Council
Marathi politicians
Living people
Year of birth missing (living people)
Date of birth missing (living people)
Bharatiya Janata Party politicians from Maharashtra